Frederick Emil Nuernberg (October 8, 1917 - June 3, 2005) was a member of the Wisconsin State Assembly.

Biography
Nuernberg was born on October 8, 1917 in Sheboygan, Wisconsin. He went on to work for the Garton Toy Company and serve in the United States Navy during World War II. Nuernberg died on June 3, 2005 at the age of 87.

Political career
Nuernberg was elected to the Assembly in 1950 and re-elected in 1952 and 1954. He was a Republican.

References

See also
The Political Graveyard

Politicians from Sheboygan, Wisconsin
Republican Party members of the Wisconsin State Assembly
Military personnel from Wisconsin
United States Navy personnel of World War II
1917 births
2005 deaths
20th-century American politicians